The 2023 United States Men's Curling Championship was held from February 5 to 11, 2023 at the Denver Coliseum in Denver, Colorado. The event was held in conjunction with the 2023 United States Women's Curling Championship. This was the first Men's Championship in two years, after the 2022 Championship was cancelled due to the COVID-19 pandemic.

Qualification
Teams qualified for the event according to the following procedure:
 Prior season's World Championship representative (Team Dropkin),
 2022 Olympic representative (Team Shuster),
 Current season's World Junior Curling Championships representative (Team Sampson),
 Three highest-ranking teams (not already qualified) on the World Curling Federation YTD ranking system as of December 20, 2022 (Team Smith, Team Sobering, Team Strouse), and
 Highest-finishing team (not already qualified) in either of two qualifying events: the Curling Stadium Contender Series (Team Casper), and the Curl Mesabi Classic (Team Dunnam).

Teams
Eight teams participated in the 2023 national championship.

Round robin standings 
Final round robin standings

Round robin results
All draw times are listed in Mountain Standard Time (UTC−07:00).

Draw 1
Sunday, February 5, 7:00 pm

Draw 2
Monday, February 6, 2:00 pm

Draw 3
Tuesday, February 7, 8:00 am

Draw 4
Tuesday, February 7, 4:00 pm

Draw 5
Wednesday, February 8, 10:00 am

Draw 6
Wednesday, February 8, 7:00 pm

Draw 7
Thursday, February 9, 2:00 pm

Playoffs

1 vs. 2
Friday, February 10, 2:00 pm

3 vs. 4
Friday, February 10, 2:00 pm

Semifinal
Friday, February 10, 7:00 pm

Final
Saturday, February 11, 12:00 pm

References

United States National Curling Championships
United States Men's
Curling, United States Men's
2023 in sports in Colorado
Sports competitions in Denver
2020s in Denver
Curling in Colorado